La Muerte en las calles is a 1952 Argentine war drama film set during the British Invasions of the River Plate of 1806-1807. The script, written by Abel Santa Cruz, is based upon a 1949 novel of the same name by Manuel Gálvez.

Cast

	Carlos Cores 
	Zoe Ducós	
	George Rigaud 
	Antonia Herrero	
	Manuel Perales	
	Roberto Airaldi	
	Francisco López Silva	
	Paquita Muñoz	
	Norma Giménez	
	Margarita Corona	
	Héctor Armendáriz	
	Norma Aleandro	
	Cayetano Biondo 
	Gerardo Rodríguez	
	José María Pedroza	
	Armando de Vicente	
	Lita Soriano
	Ricardo de Rosas 
	Humberto de la Rosa
	Arsenio Perdiguero 
	Pedro Aleandro	
	Oscar Llompart
	Miguel Dante
  Alfonso Pisano

Notes

External links
 

1952 films
1952 war films
1950s Spanish-language films
Argentine black-and-white films
Argentine war drama films
Films set in Buenos Aires
1950s Argentine films
Films directed by Leo Fleider